828 may refer to 

 the natural number 828 (number)
 the year AD 828
 the year 828 BC
 the 828 area code
 the minor planet 828 Lindemannia
 the roll film format 828 film
 the 828 Naval Air Squadron
 ARINC 828, electronic flight bag interface standard for aircraft
 Flight 828, the major subject of Manifest (TV series)

See also